State Highway 11 ( RJ SH 11) is a State Highway in Rajasthan state of India that connects Sanchore in Jalore district of Rajasthan with Abu Road in Sirohi district of Rajasthan. The total length of RJ SH 11 is 108 km. 

This highway connects National Highway 15 in Sanchore to National Highway 14 in Abu Road. Other cities and towns on this highway are: Jaitpura, Raniwara, Reodar and  Mandar.

References
 State Highway

Sirohi district
Jalore district
State Highways in Rajasthan